The Illinois Historic Preservation Division, formerly Illinois Historic Preservation Agency, is a governmental agency of the U.S. state of Illinois, and is a division of the Illinois Department of Natural Resources.  It is tasked with the duty of maintaining State-owned historic sites, and maximizing their educational and recreational value to visitors or on-line users.  In addition, it manages the process for applications within the state for additions to the National Register of Historic Places.

History of agency
The Illinois Historic Preservation Agency (IHPA) was created by State law in July 1985.  What was the agency's oldest bureau, the Illinois State Historical Library, was created in 1889, but the origins of the agency could be said to date back to the state's involvement in building and caring for the Lincoln Tomb in Springfield, Illinois, in 1865.

During the 20th century, the state of Illinois acquired and restored a wide variety of historic properties throughout the state.  One key asset, Lincoln's New Salem State Historic Site in Menard County, a reconstruction of a village where Abraham Lincoln lived in the 1830s, was established in the 1930s. The agency also administers the Cahokia World Heritage Site which includes the largest pre-columbian construction in the Americas north of Mexico.

The IHPA continued to grow after its creation in 1985, largely because of continued public interest in Lincoln as the bicentennial of his birth approached in 2009.  The Abraham Lincoln Presidential Library and Museum (ALPLM), also in Springfield, Illinois, was dedicated in 2005.  Unlike most presidential libraries, the Lincoln Library is state-owned.

The proposed 2016 budget of Governor Bruce Rauner sought to eliminate the agency, assigning its duties to the Illinois Department of Commerce and Economic Opportunity. Opponents of the move claimed that the Commerce Department had neither the expertise nor the interest to carry out the agency's functions and that any savings from the agency's 2015 budget of $15 million would be minimal.

In 2017, the Agency was split, with the historic preservation and site management duties falling to a reorganized Division within the Illinois Department of Natural Resources (which manages State Parks and other resources), and the Library (ALPLM) becoming an independent agency.

List of Illinois State Historic Sites
The following is an alphabetical listing of the more than 50 Illinois State Historic Sites that are under the jurisdiction of the Illinois Historic Preservation Division:

Albany Mounds State Historic Site, Whiteside County
Apple River Fort State Historic Site, Jo Daviess County
Bishop Hill State Historic Site, Henry County
Black Hawk State Historic Site, Rock Island County
Bryant Cottage State Historic Site, Piatt County
Buel House, Pope County
Cahokia Courthouse State Historic Site, St. Clair County
Cahokia Mounds State Historic Site, Madison County and St. Clair County
Campbell's Island State Memorial, Rock Island County
Carl Sandburg State Historic Site, Knox County
Crenshaw House, Gallatin County
Dana–Thomas House State Historic Site, Sangamon County
David Davis Mansion State Historic Site, McLean County
Douglas Tomb State Historic Site, Cook County
Fort de Chartres State Historic Site, Randolph County
Fort Kaskaskia State Historic Site, Randolph County
Governor Bond State Memorial, Randolph County
Governor Coles State Memorial, Madison County
Governor Horner State Memorial, Cook County
Governor Small Memorial and Park, Kankakee County
Grand Village of the Illinois, LaSalle County (not open to the public)
Halfway Tavern, Marion County
Hofmann Tower, Cook County
Illinois Vietnam Veterans Memorial, Sangamon County
 Purple Heart Memorial (Illinois)
Jarrot Mansion State Historic Site, St. Clair County
Jubilee College State Historic Site, Peoria County
Kaskaskia Bell State Memorial, Randolph County
Kincaid Mounds State Historic Site, Massac County
Korean War Memorial (Illinois), Sangamon County
Lewis and Clark State Historic Site, Madison County
Lincoln–Herndon Law Offices State Historic Site, Sangamon County
Lincoln Log Cabin State Historic Site (including the Reuben Moore Home), Coles County
Lincoln Monument, Lee County
Lincoln Tomb State Historic Site, Sangamon County
Lincoln Trail State Memorial, Lawrence County
Lincoln's New Salem State Historic Site, Menard County
Lovejoy State Memorial, Madison County
Martin–Boismenue House, St. Clair County
Metamora Courthouse State Historic Site, Woodford County
Mount Pulaski Courthouse State Historic Site, Logan County
Norwegian Settlers Memorial, La Salle County
Old Market House State Historic Site, Jo Daviess County
Old State Capitol State Historic Site, Sangamon County
Pierre Menard Home State Historic Site, Randolph County
Postville Courthouse State Historic Site, Logan County
Pullman Site, including:
Hotel Florence, Cook County
Rose Hotel, Hardin County
Shawneetown Bank State Historic Site, Gallatin County
U.S. Grant Home State Historic Site, Jo Daviess County
Vachel Lindsay Home, Sangamon County
Vandalia State House State Historic Site, Fayette County
Washburne House State Historic Site, Jo Daviess County
Wild Bill Hickok Memorial, LaSalle County
World War II Illinois Veterans Memorial, Sangamon County

In addition to those above administered by the Illinois Historic Preservation Division, other historic sites operated by Illinois state agencies include:
Dickson Mounds, operated by Illinois Department of Natural Resources (IDNR)
Fort Massac State Park, operated by IDNR
Starved Rock State Park, operated by IDNR

NRHP multiple property submissions

This List of NRHP Multiple Property Submission in Illinois are properties not part of a historic district but are, rather, listed individually on the National Register of Historic Places after a collective nomination with other similar properties, called a Multiple Property Submission.

 American Woman's League Chapter Houses Thematic Resources
 Archaeological Sites of Starved Rock State Park
 Architectural and Historic Resources of Vermont, Illinois, Multiple Property Submission
 Black Metropolis Thematic Resources
 Caught in the Middle; the Civil War on the Lower Ohio River
 Civil War Era National Cemeteries
 Coles County Highway Bridges Over the Embarras River Thematic Resources
 Fraternity and Sorority Houses at the Urbana-Champaign Campus of the University of Illinois Multiple Property Submission
 Highway Bridges in Iowa 1868-1945
 Historic and Historical Archaeological Resources of the Cherokee Trail of Tears
 Historic and Architectural Resources of Route 66 Through Illinois
 Historic Fairgrounds in Illinois Multiple Property Submission
 Historic Resources of Grafton, Illinois, ca. 1830-1943, Multiple Property Submission
 Historic Resources of Highland Park Multiple Resource Area
 Historic Resources of Maywood, Illinois, Multiple Property Submission
 Historic Resources of the Chicago Park District Multiple Property Submission
 Hyde Park Apartment Hotels Thematic Resources
 Illinois Carnegie Libraries Multiple Property Submission
 Illinois State Park Lodges and Cabins Thematic Resources
 Metal Highway Bridges of Fulton County Thematic Resources
 Motor Row, Chicago, Illinois
 Native American Rock Art Sites of Illinois Multiple Property Submission
 Round Barns in Illinois Thematic Resources
 Suburban Apartment Buildings in Evanston Thematic Resources
 University of Illinois Buildings by Nathan Clifford Ricker Thematic Resources
 University of Illinois Buildings Designed by Charles A. Platt

References

External links

History of Illinois

Historic Preservation
State history organizations of the United States
Government agencies established in 1985
1985 establishments in Illinois